Brinkley School District  is a public school district in Brinkley, Monroe County, Arkansas, United States.

Schools 
 C. B. Partee Elementary School, serving prekindergarten through grade 6.
 Brinkley High School, serving grades 7 through 12.

References

External links
 

Education in Monroe County, Arkansas
School districts in Arkansas